Shingobee Lake is a lake in Hubbard County, in the U.S. state of Minnesota.

Shingobee is a name derived from an Ojibwe language word for a type of evergreen.

See also
List of lakes in Minnesota

References

Lakes of Minnesota
Lakes of Hubbard County, Minnesota